Hristiyan Kazakov (born 10 March 1993) is a Bulgarian footballer who currently plays for Minyor Pernik as a midfielder.

Career
On 19 October 2014, Kazakov came on as a substitute and made his debut in A Group during the 3-1 defeat against Lokomotiv Sofia. He also participated in the 2-0 win over Panthrakikos F.C. in a friendly game, the 3-0 away defeat from Slavia Sofia in A Grupa and the dramatic home defeat in the derby game with Lokomotiv Plovdiv for that season's Bulgarian Cup.

On 7 December 2014 Kazakov came on as a substitute during the 2-0 win over PFC Haskovo. A week later he came on a substitute again, this time during the 1-0 defeat from Ludogorets Razgrad.

On 2 March 2015 Hristiyan Kazakov scored his first goal for Botev Plovdiv in extra time during the 3-0 win over Marek Dupnitsa. On 10 and 15 March Kazakov participated in the final minutes during the important 0-2 away and 2-0 home victories of Botev Plovdiv over Lokomotiv Plovdiv and CSKA Sofia.

On 23 May Kazakov came on as a late substitute but his efforts were not enough to change the score and Botev Plovdiv lost the away game versus Beroe Stara Zagora with 1-2.

On 30 October Hristiyan Kazakov made his first appearance in season 2015-16 during the 2-0 away defeat from Slavia Sofia.

In January 2016 Kazakov's contract was terminated by mutual agreement and he left Botev Plovdiv.

References

External links

1993 births
Living people
Bulgarian footballers
Association football midfielders
First Professional Football League (Bulgaria) players
FC Lyubimets players
Botev Plovdiv players
PFC Dobrudzha Dobrich players
FC Pomorie players